= Ramasagar =

Village in Karnataka, India

Coordinates: 17°54′N 78°37′E

Ramasgar is a village in Sandur Taluk, Ballari district of the southern state of Karnataka, India.

== See also ==
- Bellary
- Districts of Karnataka
